Bren Vaneske (full name: Brenda Vaneskeheian) is an Argentinian singer of Armenian background from Ciudad Autónoma de Buenos Aires. Some of her songs, including "1915", relate to her Armenian heritage and the Armenian genocide.

Discography

Albums 
 2015 – Tiempo Real

References

External links 
 Bren Vaneske at LastFM
 Bren Vaneske at Facebook
 Bren Vaneske at Instagram

21st-century Argentine women singers
Living people
Year of birth missing (living people)